Minister for Planning may refer to:
Minister for Planning and Local Government
Minister for Planning and the Environment of Luxembourg
Minister for Planning (New South Wales)
Minister for Planning (Western Australia)
Planning Ministry (Bangladesh)